Adelheid und ihre Mörder (Adelheid and Her Murderers) was a German comedy-drama television series broadcast between 1993 and 2007 by Das Erste.  65, 50 minute episodes in six series were produced. Directors included Ulrich Stark (6 episodes, 1993-1996), Arend Agthe (6 episodes, 1998-1999), Claus-Michael Rhone (20 episodes, 1996-2001), Stephan Meyer (8 episodes, 2003-2005) and Stefan Bartmann (26 episodes, 2000-2007).

The series stars Evelyn Hamann as the titular Adelheid Möbius, a witty secretary working for the Kriminalpolizei in Hamburg. She has the habit of solving the murder case by herself while the "real" investigators are still groping in the dark. However, Adelheid commonly finds herself in great danger when she exposes the murderer, only to be rescued by her colleagues.

See also
List of German television series

External links
 

German comedy-drama television series
German crime television series
1993 German television series debuts
2007 German television series endings
Television shows set in Hamburg
German-language television shows
Das Erste original programming
1990s German police procedural television series
2000s German police procedural television series